The Niagara Falls Memorial Arena is a former arena located in Niagara Falls, Ontario, Canada. Built in 1950, the arena was home to various ice hockey teams in the past, including the Niagara Falls Thunder and the Niagara Falls Flyers. It also served as the home of the Niagara Falls Canucks, a team in the Greater Ontario Junior B Hockey League. The Memorial Arena hosted four of the five games played in the 1968 Memorial Cup won by the Flyers on home ice.

The arena was replaced by the Gale Centre and was closed in 2010. It would later be purchased by Russian-based ownership and converted into a sand sculpture museum. The ownership would fall into financial difficulties and put the building up for sale in 2014. The building is still standing but has been abandoned by ownership and has fallen into a state of disrepair.

References

External links
 The OHL Arena & Travel Guide - Niagara Falls Memorial Arena

Indoor arenas in Ontario
Indoor ice hockey venues in Canada
Sports venues in Ontario
Buildings and structures in Niagara Falls, Ontario
Ontario Hockey League arenas
Sport in Niagara Falls, Ontario